Hattian Graham (born 22 June 1973) is a Barbadian cricketer. He played in one List A and four first-class matches for the Barbados cricket team from 1997 to 2000.

See also
 List of Barbadian representative cricketers

References

External links
 

1973 births
Living people
Barbadian cricketers
Barbados cricketers
People from Saint George, Barbados